Stephen Albert Michael (born 15 March 1956) is a former Australian rules footballer. More recently, Stephen is the patron of the Stephen Michael Foundation, supporting disengaged, at-risk and disadvantaged youth across Western Australia.

Playing career
A Noongar Australian Aborigine, Michael played in the WAFL between 1975 and 1985 with the South Fremantle Football Club, playing 243 games and kicking 231 goals.  He played in South's 1980 premiership side and was appointed captain in 1983.  He holds the WAFL record for the most consecutive league games with 217.  Throughout his career, Michael resisted numerous advances by VFL clubs to move east and is often listed as one of the best players to never play in the VFL.

He was a strong, high leaping ruckman who won the Sandover Medal in 1980 and 1981. His 37 votes in 1981 (with nine best-on-grounds and receiving votes in 15 of the 21 games played) was a record tally under the 3-2-1 voting system in place at the time.  He represented Western Australia in State or State of Origin football on 17 occasions, captaining the side 3 times.  In 1983 he won the Simpson Medal for the best player in the WA vs SA game and the Tassie Medal as the best player in Australia in State of Origin football and was named captain in the 1983 All-Australian Team.  He won the South Fremantle's fairest and best in 1977, 1978, 1979, 1981 and 1983.

Recognition
In 1995 he was named as an inaugural member of the Fremantle Football Hall of Legends.  In 1999, he was inducted into the Australian Football Hall of Fame.  In 2005 he was named at Centre Half Forward in the Australian Football Indigenous Team of the Century and in 2009 he was named in the ruck and captain of the South Fremantle Football Club's Indigenous Team of the Century.  In 2008, as part of the annual NAIDOC game between South Fremantle and Claremont, the Chris Lewis/Stephen Michael Award was presented to Andrew Browne for being the best player in the match.

Media
Michael was a regular guest of the Marngrook Footy Show, broadcast on Melbourne Radio.

Personal life
Stephen has 7 children; Clem, Stephen Jr., Vanessa, Cindy, Matt, Talan, Corey. Stephens son, Clem Michael, also played Australian rules football for South Fremantle Football Club (including the 1997 premiership side) and Fremantle Football Club. Clem's career was cut short by a knee injury.  Michael also has two daughters and another four sons.

Notes

References

External links

Stephen Michael player profile page at WAFL FootyFacts

1956 births
Living people
South Fremantle Football Club players
Boulder City Football Club players
Western Australian State of Origin players
Australian Football Hall of Fame inductees
Sandover Medal winners
All-Australians (1953–1988)
Noongar people
Indigenous Australian players of Australian rules football
Australian rules footballers from Western Australia
West Australian Football Hall of Fame inductees
People from Kojonup, Western Australia